is a railway station in Miyagino-ku in Sendai, Miyagi, Japan operated by East Japan Railway Company (JR East).

Lines
Nigatake Station is served by the Senseki Line.

Station layout
The station has two elevated opposed side platforms with the station building located underneath the platforms.

Platforms

History
The station renamed to its present name on February 8, 1943. The line was nationalized on May 1, 1944. The station was absorbed into the JR East network upon the privatization of JNR on April 1, 1987.

Passenger statistics
In fiscal 2018, the station was used by an average of 2,969 passengers daily (boarding passengers only).

Surrounding area
 Sendai Nigatake Police Office

See also
 List of railway stations in Japan

References

External links

  

Railway stations in Sendai
Senseki Line
Railway stations in Japan opened in 1928
Stations of East Japan Railway Company